Robert William Henry Maude (1784–1861) was an Anglican priest in Ireland in the nineteenth century.

Maude was the 10th child and 3rd son of Cornwallis Maude, 1st Viscount Hawarden. He was educated at Winchester College and Trinity College, Cambridge. He was Dean of Clogher from 1826 until his death. In 1831 he was offered the post of Archdeacon of Dublin as it was expected John Torrens would become the next Bishop of Limerick, Ardfert and Aghadoe. His sister Alicia was the wife of Lord Robert Tottenham, Bishop of Clogher.

References

1784 births
Irish Anglicans
Alumni of Trinity College, Cambridge
Deans of Clogher
1861 deaths
Maude family
People educated at Winchester College